An Exposition of the Creed was a work by John Pearson which was first published in 1659. It was based on sermons he delivered at St Clement's, Eastcheap. It was one of the most influential works on the Apostles' Creed in the Anglican Church.

References

External links
Online text from 1877 edition
An Examination of Bishop Pearson’s Exposition of the Apostles’ Creed. January 1848

Drapier's Letters, The
English non-fiction literature
Books about Christianity